The La Loma Bridge is a bridge that carries La Loma Road across the Arroyo Seco, located in Pasadena, California.

History
Built in 1914, the bridge replaced the 1898 California Street Bridge, which had closed the prior year due to safety concerns. The open spandrel concrete arch bridge has a Neoclassical design inspired by the City Beautiful movement. The bridge's design is reminiscent of Pasadena's Colorado Street Bridge, which was built a year earlier. La Loma Bridge has been called the "little sister" of it, and for the first several years of their existence, the two bridges were the only crossings of the Arroyo Seco in Pasadena.

The La Loma Bridge played a significant role in the development of Pasadena west of the Arroyo, particularly in the San Rafael Heights area, which Pasadena annexed at the same time it constructed the bridge.

The bridge was added to the National Register of Historic Places on July 14, 2004.

The bridge was closed for renovation in July 2015, and reopened on June 24, 2017, with a dedication to former California Attorney General John van de Kamp, a Pasadena native who died on March 14 of that year.

See also
 National Register of Historic Places listings in Pasadena, California

References

External links

Bridges in Los Angeles County, California
Buildings and structures in Pasadena, California
Arroyo Seco (Los Angeles County)
Concrete bridges in California
Bridges completed in 1914
Road bridges on the National Register of Historic Places in California
Buildings and structures on the National Register of Historic Places in Pasadena, California
Neoclassical architecture in California
Open-spandrel deck arch bridges in the United States